Suecia Antiqua et Hodierna ("Ancient and Modern Sweden") is a collection of engravings collected by Erik Dahlbergh during the middle of the 17th century. Suecia Antiqua et Hodierna can be described as a grand vision of Sweden during its period as a great power. Dahlberg's direct source of inspiration was the topographical publications issued by the Swiss publisher Matthäus Merian. In 1661 Dahlberg was granted a royal privilege enabling him to realize his plans, which kept him occupied for a good decade, and a work that would not be printed until after his death. In its final state Suecia Antiqua et Hodierna comprised three volumes containing 353 plates.

Gallery

External links
 
Suecia Antiqua et Hodierna at the Royal Library of Sweden
Suecia Antiqua et Hodierna at the World Digital Library

Swedish culture
17th-century engravings